"Get Your Roll On" is a single by the Big Tymers, from their third studio album, I Got That Work. It reached #24 on the Billboard Hot R&B/Hip-Hop Singles & Tracks chart. The song is about driving expensive cars and eating ecstasy at various dance club establishments.

Charts

Weekly charts

Year-end charts

References

2000 singles
Big Tymers songs
Cash Money Records singles
Song recordings produced by Mannie Fresh
2000 songs
Songs written by Birdman (rapper)
Songs written by Mannie Fresh